Deming station is an Amtrak train station at 400 East Railroad Boulevard in Deming, New Mexico. The station consists of a simple metal shelter with a bench inside (sometimes derisively called an "Amshack") with train information posted on a sign outside. There is no platform at this station, trains stop at a paved vehicle crossing where passengers board.

History 

In March 1881, the second transcontinental railroad, uniting the Atchison, Topeka, and Santa Fe Railway from the east with the Southern Pacific Railway from the west, was completed at Deming. To mark the occasion, a silver spike was driven to connect the rails. Deming subsequently received a large two-story "union depot" that in 1930 was remodeled into a one-story structure.

The original old wood depot has since been moved and repurposed.

References

External links

Deming Amtrak station information

 Deming Amtrak Station (USA Rail Guide -- Train Web)

Amtrak stations in New Mexico
Buildings and structures in Luna County, New Mexico
Transportation in Luna County, New Mexico
Railway stations in the United States opened in 1881
Former Southern Pacific Railroad stations
Atchison, Topeka and Santa Fe Railway stations
1881 establishments in New Mexico Territory